Once to Every Woman is a 1934 American pre-Code film adaptation of A. J. Cronin's 1933 short story Kaleidoscope in "K". The film was made by Columbia Pictures and stars Ralph Bellamy and Fay Wray.

Plot 
Mary Fanshawe (Fay Wray) is a dedicated, professional supervising nurse in an urban hospital.  She is very friendly with one resident, Dr. Preston (Walter Byron), although it is clear that she is not his sole object of attention.  Fanshawe reprimands one young nurse, Doris Andros (Mary Carlisle) for her careless attitude, but she is unaware that  Andros and Preston are seeing one another in secret.  Fanshawe is far less friendly with young Dr. Jim Barclay (Ralph Bellamy) despite his attentions toward her.  Barclay, though, is also distracted by tensions with his superior, Dr. Walter Selby (Walter Connolly), who rejects the younger man's suggestions of trying more modern medical and surgical techniques.

During a crucial operation that Selby had insisted on performing himself, he finds himself unable to continue and hands the procedure to Barclay, who succeeds with a radically new technique, calmly observed by Fanshawe, who is acting as head nurse.  Selby is forced to concede that his own time as a lead surgeon and hospital head has passed.  Later, when a patient nearly commits suicide because of a mistake made by Andros, Barclay discovers  the nurse with Preston, who was supposed to be on rounds in the ward, together on the hospital's rooftop.

Barclay attempts to cover for his fellow doctor, but when Andros learns she is to be fired, she threatens to expose the deceit.  In the end, both Andros and Preston are forced to leave, with Fanshawe and Barclay now ready to collaborate both professionally and personally.

Cast
Ralph Bellamy as Dr. Jim Barclay
Fay Wray as Mary Fanshawe
Walter Connolly as Dr. Walter Selby
Mary Carlisle as Doris Andros
Walter Byron as Dr. Preston
J. Farrell MacDonald as Flannigan
Billie Seward as No. 5
Georgia Caine as Jeff
Katherine Clare Ward as Mrs Flannigan
Ben Alexander as Joe
Nora Cecil as Baxter's sister
Sheila Darcy as Gail Drake 
Jane Darwell as Mrs. Wood

External links

1934 films
1934 romantic drama films
American romantic drama films
American black-and-white films
Columbia Pictures films
Films based on works by A. J. Cronin
Films based on short fiction
Films directed by Lambert Hillyer
Films set in the 20th century
Films set in London
Medical-themed films
Films with screenplays by Jo Swerling
Films produced by Robert North
1930s English-language films
1930s American films